Krishna Chandra Bhattacharya, also known as K.C. Bhattacharya, (12 May 1875 – 11 December 1949) was a philosopher at the University of Calcutta known for his method of "constructive interpretation" through which relations and problematics of ancient Indian philosophical systems are drawn out and developed so that they can be studied like problems of modern philosophy. He was especially interested in the problematic of how the mind (or consciousness) creates an apparently material universe. Bhattacharya encouraged the idea of an immersive cosmopolitanism in which Indian systems of philosophy were modernized through assimilation and immersion rather than through a blind imitation of European ideas.

Early life
Krishna Chandra Bhattacharya was born on 12 May 1875 at Serampore in a family of Sanskrit scholars. Krishnachandra took his school education in a local school. After passing the matriculation examination in 1891 he went to the Presidency College, then affiliated with the University of Calcutta.

Bibliography
Studies in Sankhya Philosophy
 Studies in Philosophy
 Studies in Vedantism
 Implications of Kant's Philosophy (translation of Kantadarsaner Tatparyya)
 Search for the Absolute in Neo-Vedanta

Lecture
  Swaraj in Ideas

References

Bhattacharya, K C
Bhattacharya, K C
20th-century Hindu philosophers and theologians
20th-century Indian philosophers
University of Calcutta alumni
Academic staff of the University of Calcutta
Bengali Hindus
Scholars from West Bengal
20th-century Indian non-fiction writers
Bengali philosophers
Bengali writers
20th-century Bengalis
Indian male writers